Jaipan Industries Limited is Indian home appliances company based in Mumbai, Maharashtra, India. It manufactures and markets various Home Appliances and Non stick cookware’s under the brand name of Jaipan. It is also manufactures of consumer durable products and Mobile handsets. It also markets its products in a number of countries like Sri Lanka, Mauritius, Bangladesh, Nepal, U.A.E. It has more than 140 products, 125 distributors and more than 6000 dealers across India. Its products include food processors, mixers, juicers, hand mixers, blenders, irons, sandwich toasters, pop-up toasters, roti makers, mechanical fans, home theatres, gas heaters, gas burners, water purifiers, vacuum cleaners, tea kettles, rice cookers, dutch ovens, ovens, stainless cutlery and dinnersets.

References

External links
Official website
Online shopping official website

Manufacturing companies based in Mumbai
Manufacturing companies established in 1984
Cooking appliance brands
Indian brands
Home appliance manufacturers of India
Indian companies established in 1984
1984 establishments in Maharashtra
Companies listed on the Bombay Stock Exchange